Kirsti is a feminine given name. Related names include Kersti, Kirsten, Kjersti. Notable people with the name include:

 Kirsti Andersen (born 1941), Danish historian of mathematics
 Kirsti Bergstø (born 1981), Norwegian politician
 Kirsti Biermann (born 1950), Norwegian speed skater
 Kirsti Blom (born 1953), Norwegian author
 Kirsti Coward (born 1940), Norwegian judge
 Kirsti Eskelinen (born 1948), Finnish diplomat
 Kirsti Huke (born 1977), Norwegian singer and composer
 Kirsti Ilvessalo (1920–2019), Finnish textile artist
 Kirsti Kauppi (born 1957), Finnish diplomat
 Kirsti Koch Christensen (born 1940), Norwegian linguist
 Kirsti Kolle Grøndahl (born 1943), Norwegian politician
 Kirsti Lay (born 1988), Canadian cyclist and speed skater
 Kirsti Leirtrø (born 1963), Norwegian politician
 Kirsti Lintonen (born 1945), Finnish politician
 Kirsti Manninen (born 1952), Finnish writer and screenwriter
 Kirsti Paltto (born 1947), Finnish writer
 Kirsti Saxi (born 1953), Norwegian politician
 Kirsti Sparboe (born 1946), Norwegian singer
 Kirsti Strøm Bull (born 1945), Norwegian professor of law

See also 
 
 
 Kirsty, a given name

References 

Danish feminine given names
Estonian feminine given names
Finnish feminine given names
Norwegian feminine given names